Keba Paul Koulibaly (born 24 March 1986) is a Burkinabé footballer who plays as a defender for EFO and the Burkina Faso national team. He plays as a centre-back or a left-back.

Personal life
Paul's twin brother, Pierre Koulibaly is also a professional footballer.

Club
Paul Koulibaly began his career with EFO in Burkina Faso.

In January 2008, he signed a contract with Al-Ittihad Tripoli  club, but due to the maximum numbers of foreigners players playing in squad, they loaned him out to Al-Nasr Benghazi.

He went for a trial with Leeds United towards the end of July 2010, but was not kept.

In 2010–2011, he played for Asswehly and then left for R.O.C. de Charleroi-Marchienne.

In 2012, he moved to Dinamo București. Won the 2012 Romanian Supercup with the club. After playing in the club for six months, he went to the Iraqi club Al Shorta. He won the Iraqi Premier League with the club.

In 2014, he moved to the Guinean club Horoya AC. With him he won all the trophies in Guinea (championship, cup and super cup). In 2017 he returned to the EFO.

Koulibaly made his debut for Burkina Faso in 2006. Together with the Burkina Faso national team, he took part in four African Cups of Nations. In 2013, together with her, he reached the final of the tournament, where his team lost to Nigeria 0–1. On January 10, 2015, Koulibaly played his last international match in a friendly against Swaziland.

Honours

Team
EFO
Burkinabé Premier League: 2008
Coupe du Faso: 2006, 2008
Dinamo București
Romanian Supercup: 2012
Al-Shorta
Iraqi Premier League: 2012–13

Trivia
His twin brother Pan Pierre Koulibaly is also a footballer.

References

External links
 

1986 births
Living people
Burkinabé footballers
Association football defenders
Burkinabé Christians
Expatriate footballers in Libya
Étoile Filante de Ouagadougou players
FC Dinamo București players
Liga I players
Burkinabé expatriate footballers
Burkinabé expatriate sportspeople in Libya
Burkinabé expatriate sportspeople in Belgium
Burkinabé expatriate sportspeople in Romania
Burkinabé expatriate sportspeople in Iraq
Burkinabé expatriate sportspeople in Egypt
Burkinabé expatriate sportspeople in Guinea
Expatriate footballers in Belgium
Expatriate footballers in Romania
Expatriate footballers in Iraq
Expatriate footballers in Egypt
Expatriate footballers in Guinea
Burkina Faso international footballers
2010 Africa Cup of Nations players
2012 Africa Cup of Nations players
2013 Africa Cup of Nations players
Burkinabé twins
Twin sportspeople
Asswehly S.C. players
Sportspeople from Ouagadougou
2015 Africa Cup of Nations players
Al-Shorta SC players
Horoya AC players
Libyan Premier League players
21st-century Burkinabé people